Otto Hermann Leopold Heckmann (June 23, 1901 – May 13, 1983) was a German astronomer.

He directed the Hamburg Observatory from 1941 to 1962, after which he became the first director of the European Southern Observatory. He actively contributed to the creation of the third issue of the Astronomische Gesellschaft Katalog. He also contributed to cosmology based on the fundamentals of general relativity, and wrote the book Theorien der Kosmologie.

In 1933 Heckmann signed the Vow of allegiance of the Professors of the German Universities and High-Schools to Adolf Hitler and the National Socialistic State. He also joined the Nazi Party.

He won the James Craig Watson Medal in 1961 and the Bruce Medal in 1964.

Heckmann also served as President of the International Astronomical Union in 1967, and following a Polish request and under the impression of German acts in Poland during World War II, made the controversial decision to hold an Extraordinary IAU General Assembly in February 1973 in Warsaw, Poland, to commemorate the 500th anniversary of Nicolaus Copernicus, shortly after the regular 1973 GA was held in Australia.

The asteroid 1650 Heckmann is named after him.  He married Johanna Topfmeier in 1925 and they had three children together.

Works 
 Theorien der Kosmologie. Berlin: Springer, 1942 und 1968
 Sterne, Kosmos, Weltmodelle. München: Piper, 1976 (auch dtv-Taschenbuch)

External links
 Bruce Medal page
 Awarding of the Bruce Medal: PASP 76 (1964) 135
 Heckmann, Otto Hermann Leopold. From Complete Dictionary of Scientific Biography, 2008.

Obituaries
 MitAG 60 (1983) 9 (in German)
 QJRAS 25 (1984) 374

References

1901 births
1983 deaths
20th-century German astronomers
Nazi Party members
Members of the German Academy of Sciences at Berlin
Members of the Göttingen Academy of Sciences and Humanities
Presidents of the International Astronomical Union
Members of the Royal Swedish Academy of Sciences